Alexander Mikhailovich Lermontov (27 February 1838 – 26 December 1906) was an Imperial Russian division commander. He participated in the war against the Ottoman Empire.

Awards
Order of Saint Anna, 3rd class, 1863
Order of Saint Stanislaus (House of Romanov), 2nd class, 1867
Order of Saint Stanislaus with Imperial Crown, 1869
Order of Saint Anna, 2nd class, 1871
Order of Saint Vladimir, 4th class, 1873
Gold Sword for Bravery, 1878
Order of Saint Stanislaus (House of Romanov), 1st class, 1867
Order of Saint Vladimir, 3rd class, 1882
Order of Saint Anna, 1st class, 1882
Order of Saint Vladimir, 2nd class, 1885
Order of the White Eagle (Russian Empire), 1890
Order of Saint Alexander Nevsky, 1897
Order of the Red Eagle, 2nd class, 1875
Order of the Crown (Prussia), 2nd class, 1880

Sources
 Раритетная библиотека исторических фактов
 Памятник Восточной Войны 1877—1878 гг. Составил: А. А. Старчевский. Издание: М. Г. Назимовой. С.—Петербург. Типография Б. Г. Янпольского, Демидов пер., дом № 5, 1878.
 Паметниците на града — духовни мостове във времето 
 Список генералам по старшинству 1905 года.

1838 births
1906 deaths
Russian military personnel of the Russo-Turkish War (1877–1878)
Recipients of the Order of St. Anna, 3rd class
Recipients of the Order of Saint Stanislaus (Russian), 2nd class
Recipients of the Order of St. Anna, 2nd class
Recipients of the Order of St. Vladimir, 4th class
Recipients of the Gold Sword for Bravery
Recipients of the Order of Saint Stanislaus (Russian), 1st class
Recipients of the Order of St. Vladimir, 3rd class
Recipients of the Order of St. Anna, 1st class
Recipients of the Order of St. Vladimir, 2nd class
Recipients of the Order of the White Eagle (Russia)